The Chinese Cycling Association (in Simplified Chinese: 中国自行车运动协会) is the national governing body of cycle racing in China.

It is a member of the UCI and the Asian Cycling Confederation.

External links
Official website

National members of the Asian Cycling Confederation
Cycle racing organizations
Members of the All-China Sports Federation
Cycle racing in China